Ethyl cellulose (or ethylcellulose) is a derivative of cellulose in which some of the hydroxyl groups on the repeating glucose units are converted into ethyl ether groups.  The number of ethyl groups can vary depending on the manufacturer.

It is mainly used as a thin-film coating material for coating paper, vitamin and medical pills, and for thickeners in cosmetics and in industrial processes.

Food grade ethyl cellulose is one of few non-toxic films and thickeners which are not water soluble. This property allows it to be used to safeguard ingredients from water.

Ethyl cellulose is also used as a food additive as an emulsifier (E462).

See also
 Ethyl methyl cellulose
 Methyl cellulose

References

Cellulose
Food additives
Excipients
Cellulose ethers
E-number additives